Remy Munasifi (born June 16, 1980) is an American stand-up comedian, parody musician, rapper and video artist, who became an Internet celebrity after his production of comedic sketches based on Arabs under the name "GoRemy" on YouTube. His videos have gained over 98 million views as of June 2021.

Personal life
Munasifi was born in Washington, D.C. and grew up in McLean, Virginia. He has an Iraqi father who is a doctor,
and a Lebanese mother who is a Pilates instructor. Munasifi graduated from the Honors Program at Wheeling Jesuit University in Wheeling, West Virginia in 2002.

He has been to Lebanon numerous times; many of his relatives moved there from Iraq after the Iraq War began in 2003.

Career

Munasifi's comedic alter-ego "Habib Abdul Habib" received much popularity for joking about matters such as U.S. security screening. He is known for a video titled "Arlington: The Rap", which received 300,000 views in less than a day.

In 2009, he signed with the Gersh Agency, and later landed a Comedy Central Records deal. Munasifi has since been the opening act for rapper Wale, comedian Brian Posehn and others.

He has performed several times in the New York Arab-American Comedy Festival. Munasifi's debut EP, titled The Falafel Album, is available on iTunes. The Falafel Album was highly influenced by Munasifi's Iraqi and Lebanese heritage, especially culture and food.

Munasifi's 2011 political spoof video titled "Raise the Debt Ceiling" had over 520,000 hits on YouTube. He was interviewed on several national news programs about the content of the song as well as his views about the debt ceiling.

Since 2010, Munasifi has partnered with Reason TV and the Reason Foundation to create libertarian parody videos.

In 2020, he created a second channel, MTGRemy, which posts parody songs and skits about the popular trading card game, Magic the Gathering.

Discography

Studio albums

EPs
 The Falafel Album (2010)

References

External links
Official website

1980 births
American comedians of Arab descent
American YouTubers
American people of Lebanese descent
American rappers 
American stand-up comedians
Living people
People from Arlington County, Virginia
People from Washington, D.C.
Video bloggers
Wheeling University alumni
American people of Iraqi descent
YouTube channels launched in 2006
21st-century American comedians